Trim or trimming in clothing and home decorating is applied ornament, such as gimp, passementerie, ribbon, Ruffle (sewing)s, or, as a verb, to apply such ornament.

Before the industrial revolution, all trim was made and applied by hand, thus making heavily trimmed furnishings and garments expensive and high-status.  Machine-woven trims and sewing machines put these dense trimmings within the reach of even modest dressmakers and home sewers, and an abundance of trimming is a characteristic of mid-Victorian fashion. As a predictable reaction, high fashion came to emphasize exquisiteness of cut and construction over denseness of trimming, and applied trim became a signifier of mass-produced clothing by the 1930s. The iconic braid and gold button trim of the Chanel suit are a notable survival of trim in high fashion.

In home decorating, the 1980s and 1990s saw a fashion for dense, elaborately layered trimmings on upholstered furniture and drapery.

Today, most trimmings are commercially manufactured. Scalamandré is known for elaborate trim for home furnishings, and Wrights is a leading manufacturer of trim for home sewing and crafts.  Conso is another leading manufacturer.  
Trims are used generally to enhance the beauty of the garments. It attracts buyers. Appropriate use of it creates more value of the product.

See also

References

Fashion design
Notions (sewing)
Parts of clothing
Trim